The Oregon Business Development Department (OBDD) dba Business Oregon is a government agency of the U.S. state of Oregon, providing support of economic and community development and cultural enhancement through administration of a variety of programs of incentives, financial support, and technical assistance to businesses, nonprofit organizations and community groups, industries, and local and regional governments and districts.

It is governed by a seven-member commission, appointed by the governor, which guides department policies and strategies to implement its mission: to create, retain, expand and attract businesses that provide sustainable, living wage jobs for Oregonians through public-private partnerships, leveraged funding and support of economic opportunities for Oregon companies and entrepreneurs.

In addition, the Oregon Arts Commission receives administrative support from the agency, and the semi-privatized Oregon Film and Video Office receives direct monetary support.

Its headquarters is in Salem, Oregon and it maintains twelve regional offices in locations throughout the state.

Divisions, bureaus and sections
Director's Office
Human Resources
Fiscal and Budget Services
Infrastructure Finance Authority
Program Services & Coordinators
Regional Services & Coordinators
Ports Section
Financial Services Division
Business Innovation and Trade Development Division
Business Services Section
Emerging Small Business Services
Global Strategies
Recruitment services
Business Development Officers
Policy & Planning Division
Government Relations
Strategic Initiatives
Public Affairs
Marketing & Communications
Information Technology
Oregon Arts Commission
Oregon Cultural Trust

Commission Members 
E. Walter Van Valkenburg (Chair), Chandra Brown, Steve Emery, Tony Hyde, Anne Root, Gregory Semler, Junki Yoshida, Senator Betsy Johnson and Representative David Edwards.

References

External links
 Official website

Economic and Community Development Department